Assou-Ekotto is a surname. Notable people with the surname include:

Benoît Assou-Ekotto (born 1984), footballer
Mathieu Assou-Ekotto (born 1978), French footballer